Phillip Duane Hardberger (born July 27, 1934) is an American politician and lawyer who served as mayor of San Antonio, taking office in June, 2005. A Democrat, he was elected on a non-partisan ballot.

Life and career

Family and early years
Hardberger was born in Morton, the seat of Cochran County in West Texas, to Homer Reeves Hardberger (1908–1986) and the former Bess Scott (1913–2008). In 1943, the family moved to O'Donnell, Texas. As a youth, Hardberger worked in cotton gins. His mother, a native of Burnet County, taught school in O'Donnell for thirty-three years and was a 1955 graduate of Texas Tech University in Lubbock. Son Phil graduated the same year from Baylor University in Waco. Hardberger was reared in the Baptist Church. He has a younger sister, Jan Peranteau, who was born in 1945 in Lamesa, the seat of Dawson County, also in the Texas South Plains country. Hardberger said that his mother was "the single most cheerful person I've ever known. She loved the trees and flowers here in San Antonio and always had a positive spirit."

Military career
After Baylor, Hardberger was a captain in the United States Air Force and piloted the B-47 bomber. He was the executive secretary of the Peace Corps during the administration of U.S. President John F. Kennedy. He was a special assistant to the director of the U.S. Office of Economic Opportunity under President Lyndon B. Johnson.

He would then be appointed Associate Justice and then Chief Justice of the Fourth Court of Appeals. As chief justice, he presided over the Littleton v. Prange case, invalidating marriages in the court's jurisdiction if the transgender partner is of the same birth sex. It simultaneously also opened the option for some same-sex couples to marry as long as the two partners were assigned to the opposite sex at birth. He and Linda had two daughters, Amy and Kimberlea.

Political career
Hardberger's decision to run for mayor in the fall of 2004 was somewhat of a surprise because no one without a city council background had been elected mayor of San Antonio in modern history. He defeated Councilman Julian Castro, his ultimate successor as mayor, in a runoff on June 7, 2005. Hardberger himself succeeded Ed Garza, who was prohibited by city statute from serving more than two two-year terms.

He was in office during the fall of 2005 when the New Orleans Saints were displaced as a result of Hurricane Katrina and set up their operations in San Antonio. The 2005 season was split between the Alamodome in San Antonio and LSU's Tiger Stadium in Baton Rouge. Various media reports in the San Antonio Express-News indicated the owner and government officials in San Antonio were working behind the scenes concerning a possible permanent relocation to San Antonio. Hardberger pushed a strong verbal campaign to pursue the Saints. Other officials, including then-Texas Governor Rick Perry, had indicated they would also support a relocation to San Antonio, including using funding to upgrade the Alamodome, or possibly build a new stadium.

It is disputed in some circles as to the amount of discussions that happened between Mayor Hardberger and the New Orleans Saints. According to the San Antonio Express-News, Mayor Hardberger encouraged Saints owner Tom Benson to sue the NFL and commissioner Paul Tagliabue to try to keep the team in San Antonio permanently. No lawsuit was ever filed. Hardberger hasn't given up hope on another professional sports team even though the Saints have returned to New Orleans when he said, "Sometimes dates do lead to marriage proposals. We don't have to be a one-franchise town." Hardberger went on to say,"I'm going to support the county judge on this Marlins thing," Hardberger says. "But I have not changed my mind about the NFL. Baseball is a great game. But there isn't any doubt in my mind that, if we're going to take on an additional professional franchise, the great majority of people here would like a football team."..."I am absolutely certain that we will wind up with an NFL team in the next few years. It is coming, and if it's not the Saints, it will be somebody else." At the time Hardberger was first elected the city had been in talks with Major League Soccer to bring a franchise to the city as part of the league's continued expansion plans. Hardberger put an end to the talks, stating "Goodbye. That's what I would tell MLS,"  contending that the deal did not make financial sense for San Antonio.

Hardberger was re-elected in May 2007 and completed his term in May 2009. One of his final acts as Mayor was to garner support to change the city's mayoral term limits from two to four two-year terms. He garnered 77% of the vote during his re-election in 2007 and left the mayor's office at the end of his second term with an approval rating of 86 percent.

During his two terms in office he was instrumental in leading San Antonio's response to Katrina and Rita victims, growing San Antonio's park space with the acquisition of Voelcker Park and the new San Antonio River expansion, starting Haven for Hope as a new city facility for San Antonio's growing homeless population, and setting the city on the road to being recognized as a green city as a result of its Mission Verde initiative. He was responsible for redeveloping Main Plaza to restore the city's original downtown center of government and society (dating to Spanish territorial days) and for bringing on Sheryl Sculley as City Manager.

After mayorship
In December 2009, in recognition of the former mayor's leadership and foresight in championing quality of life projects, the City of San Antonio announced it was changing the name of Voelcker Park to Phil Hardberger Park.

In January 2010, Hardberger became a shareholder at Cox Smith, the largest law firm in San Antonio and one of the leading business law firms in Texas. He supports the firm's Litigation, Appellate, Public Law and Economic Development practices, and is actively involved in the firm's external affairs and community relations. Hardberger said he plans to continue working on issues surrounding the city's River Walk expansion, development of the Bexar County Performing Arts Center and completion of Phil Hardberger Park off Blanco Road.

In February 2015, Probate Court judge Tom Rickhoff named Hardberger and attorney Art Bayern as co-executors of the testamentary trust of Shirley L. Benson, late wife of the billionaire businessman Tom Benson. The two replace  Benson as trustees of the estate. Benson's estranged adopted daughter, Renee Benson, and her two adult children are seeking to prevent changes to Shirley Benson's trust. She maintains that her father, the owner of the New Orleans Saints and San Antonio Mercedes-Benz, has grown incapable of handling his financial affairs.

As a former mayor, but not a registered lobbyist, Hardberger in 2017 advocated successfully for Lake Assault Boats of Superior, Wisconsin, to obtain a $6.2 million contract to build sightseeing boats for the San Antonio River Walk. He was retained as an attorney for the Chicago-area firm in December 2016.

Hardberger's role in representing Lake Assault Boats brought him into conflict with Mayor Ivy Taylor, who claimed a conflict of interest "tainted beyond redemption" in the selection of the company. One of Taylor's mayoral opponents, city council member Ron Niremberg, however, charged her with "changing the rules in the middle of the process to rig the outcome." Taylor had favored retention of the local contract company, Rio San Antonio Cruises.

References

External links

Mayor's page

1934 births
Living people
Mayors of San Antonio
Texas Democrats
United States Air Force officers
Military personnel from San Antonio
Baylor University alumni
Baptists from Texas
Texas state court judges
People from O'Donnell, Texas
People from Cochran County, Texas